Mersin Orthodox Church ( is a church in Mersin, Turkey.

Geography

History
The church was built in 1870 during the Ottoman Empire era. Its building area was donated by Dimitri Nadir and Tannus Nadir and it was commissioned by Christians who migrated from Syria and Lebanon (then parts of the Ottoman Empire).  According to an inscription it was dedicated to Mihail Athangelos (Michael). According to one source it was also dedicated to Gabriel.

The dependency
The church is under the control of the Antiochian Orthodox Church.

References

Akdeniz District
Buildings and structures in Mersin
1870 establishments in the Ottoman Empire
Eastern Orthodox church buildings in Turkey
19th-century churches in Turkey
19th-century Eastern Orthodox church buildings
Churches completed in 1870
Active churches in Turkey